Thomas Grubb McCullough (April 20, 1785 – September 10, 1848) was a member of the U.S. House of Representatives from Pennsylvania.

Thomas Grubb McCullough was born in Greencastle, Pennsylvania, the son of Robert and Prudence (Grubb) McCullough.  He studied law and was admitted to the Franklin County, Pennsylvania, bar on April 8, 1806.  He served in the War of 1812 as a private and later as quartermaster.

McCullough was elected as a Federalist to the Sixteenth Congress to fill the vacancy caused by the resignation of David Fullerton.  He served in the Pennsylvania House of Representatives from 1831 to 1835.  He was the first president of the Cumberland Valley Railroad Company and managed and edited the Franklin Repository.  He was president of the Bank of Chambersburg at the time of his death in Chambersburg, Pennsylvania, on September 10, 1848.

Sources

The Political Graveyard

1785 births
1848 deaths
Members of the Pennsylvania House of Representatives
Pennsylvania lawyers
American military personnel of the War of 1812
People from Franklin County, Pennsylvania
Quartermasters
Federalist Party members of the United States House of Representatives from Pennsylvania
19th-century American politicians